Mikel Abando Arana (born March 22, 1995) is a Spanish professional footballer who plays as a forward for Icelandic football team ÍF Völsungur. Mainly a forward, he can also play as a left or right winger, and as an attacking midfielder.

Club career
Abando was born in Bilbao and started his football career at the age of 8 in the lower categories of Arenas Club de Getxo youth academy. During his years at the club, he represented the Basque Country national team at the U-16 and U-18 levels. He made his debut at the age of 16 for their U-19 team at División de Honor Nacional, the highest league of youth academy level in Spain.

In 2013, he transferred to Santutxu FC U-19. After being the top goal scorer of the team, he was promoted to the main Santutxu FC squad which competed in the Tercera División in 2014. 

In 2016, Abando moved to US and signed with the Longwood Lancers of Longwood University which competed in the Big South Conference in the NCAA Division I. He became one of the top goal scorers of the program history, and was named an "All American" by the United Soccer Coaches in the NSCAA 2018 Convention in Philadelphia.

In 2020, he moved back to Spain and joined C.D. Guadalajara. 

On April 23, 2022, he transferred to Icelandic team ÍF Völsungur.

Clubs

See also
ÍF Völsungur
CD Guadalajara (Spain)

References

External links
Soccerway profile
Lapreferente profile

Living people
1995 births
Spanish footballers
Expatriate soccer players in the United States
Longwood Lancers men's soccer players